Jaime Arturo Larrazabal Bretón (born 26 May 1952) is a Mexican politician from the Institutional Revolutionary Party. From 2000 to 2003 he served as Deputy of the LVIII Legislature of the Mexican Congress representing Oaxaca, and previously served in the Legislative Assembly of the Federal District from 1997 to 2000.

His brother Fernando is also a politician.

References

1952 births
Living people
Politicians from Oaxaca
Institutional Revolutionary Party politicians
21st-century Mexican politicians
Mexican people of Basque descent
Deputies of the LVIII Legislature of Mexico
Members of the Chamber of Deputies (Mexico) for Oaxaca
Benito Juárez Autonomous University of Oaxaca alumni
20th-century Mexican politicians
Members of the Congress of Mexico City